The Vucova is a left tributary of the river Șurgani in Romania. It flows into the Șurgani near Chevereșu Mare.

References

Rivers of Romania
Rivers of Timiș County